Albert Lea may refer to:

Albert Lea, Minnesota, U.S.
Albert Lea Township, Freeborn County, Minnesota, U.S.
Albert Miller Lea, U.S. Army engineer for whom the places are named